The Global Coalition Against Child Pneumonia exists to raise global awareness about the deadly toll of the number 1 killer of children - pneumonia. Every year 155 million children under 5 get sick and 1.6 million lose their lives to pneumonia, more than all child deaths combined from AIDS, malaria and measles.  Almost all of these child deaths occur in developing countries with most concentrated in just seven - India, China, Democratic Republic of Congo, Ethiopia, Nigeria, Pakistan and Afghanistan.

Children die from pneumonia despite the existence of vaccines that can prevent the leading causes of pneumonia and cost-effective antibiotics that can treat children who are sick.  The Global Coalition Against Child Pneumonia is working to save millions of lives through protecting children against pneumonia with proper nutrition through exclusive breastfeeding, preventing pneumonia with new and existing vaccines, particularly Hib vaccine and Pneumococcal conjugate vaccine and treating pneumonia by training health workers to recognize symptoms of pneumonia and increasing access to appropriate antibiotic treatment.

WHO and UNICEF estimate that these interventions, combined with others, could save 1 million children's lives every year taking the world one big step closer to achieving Millennium Development Goals.

World Pneumonia Day
Pneumonia has been overshadowed as a priority on the global health agenda, and rarely receives coverage in the news media. To combat this, the Global Coalition against Child Pneumonia is raising a collective voice to renew the global fight against pneumonia by holding World Pneumonia Day every year.   It will provide an annual forum for the world to stand together and demand action in the fight against pneumonia. The first World Pneumonia Day was held on November 2, 2009 and in 2010 World Pneumonia Day falls on November 12.  World Pneumonia Day will help bring this health crisis to the public’s attention and will encourage policy makers and grass roots organizers alike to combat the disease.

Coalition members
The WHO, UNICEF and the Centers for Disease Control and Prevention (CDC) offer technical assistance to the Global Coalition.

Press Releases
 Child Health Leaders Call for Day to Unite Against Pneumonia, World’s Top Child Killer
 Momentum builds in effort to save millions of children from pneumonia
 Global Fight Against #1 Killer of Children Welcomes The Earth Institute
 New WHO Data Underscores Global Threat of the World’s Leading Child Killer
 Momentum Builds for First-Ever World Pneumonia Day
 GiveVaccines.org Announces Plans to Donate Funds to the Global Coalition Against Child Pneumonia for the Purchase of Life-Saving Vaccines
 Hedge Funds vs. Malaria & Pneumonia Recognizes Participants in World Pneumonia Day event

References

External links
 World Pneumonia Day
 PneumoADIP
 The GAVI Alliance
 GAVI Campaign 
 Save the Children
 PATH

Pneumonia
Public health organizations
International medical and health organizations